The Gödel Prize is an annual prize for outstanding papers in the area of theoretical computer science, given jointly by the European Association for Theoretical Computer Science (EATCS) and the Association for Computing Machinery Special Interest Group on Algorithms and Computational Theory (ACM SIGACT). The award is named in honor of Kurt Gödel. Gödel's connection to theoretical computer science is that he was the first to mention the "P versus NP" question, in a 1956 letter to John von Neumann in which Gödel asked whether a certain NP-complete problem could be solved in quadratic or linear time.

The Gödel Prize has been awarded since 1993. The prize is awarded either at STOC (ACM Symposium on Theory of Computing, one of the main North American conferences in theoretical computer science) or ICALP (International Colloquium on Automata, Languages and Programming, one of the main European conferences in the field).  To be eligible for the prize, a paper must be published in a refereed journal within the last 14 (formerly 7) years.  The prize includes a reward of US$5000.

The winner of the Prize is selected by a committee of six members. The EATCS President and the SIGACT Chair each appoint three members to the committee, to serve staggered three-year terms. The committee is chaired alternately by representatives of EATCS and SIGACT.

In contrast with the Gödel Prize, which recognizes outstanding papers, the Knuth Prize is awarded to individuals for their overall impact in the field.

Recipients

Winning papers

See also

 List of computer science awards

Notes

References
Prize website with list of winners

Theoretical computer science
Computer science awards
Awards established in 1993
Annual events